Methylobacterium tardum  is a bacterium from the genus of Methylobacterium which has been isolated from water from a food factory in Japan.

References

Further reading

External links
Type strain of Methylobacterium tardum at BacDive -  the Bacterial Diversity Metadatabase

Hyphomicrobiales
Bacteria described in 2008